Ink Blot Natural Area Preserve is a Washington state Natural Area Preserve located in Mason County. The preserve totals , mostly wetlands and Sphagnum bogs in three parallel glacier-formed basins.

The preserve was created in 2010 with a purchase by the State of Washington from a private landowner.

References

External links

Photographs and commentary by Joseph Rocchio, conservation ecologist
Ink Blot and Shumocher Creek NAPs, Washington Wildlife and Recreation Coalition

Protected areas of Mason County, Washington
Washington Natural Areas Program
Landforms of Mason County, Washington
Bogs of Washington (state)